Chiara Gmür (born 12 February 1993) is a Swiss alpine skier who is currently a member of the Swiss B-team, specializing in the Slalom discipline. She placed 20th in a 2016 Alpine Skiing World Cup slalom  in Santa Caterina on 5 January 2015.

References

Living people
1993 births
Swiss female alpine skiers
Place of birth missing (living people)
21st-century Swiss women